Perissodonta mirabilis is a species of sea snail, a marine gastropod mollusk in the family Struthiolariidae, the ostrich-foot shells.

Description

Distribution

References

Struthiolariidae
Gastropods described in 1875